Dolores “Dolly” Aglay-Elona (c.1967 – May 26, 2008) was a Filipino business and financial journalist who worked for the Manila news bureau of  Reuters News Agency and the Philippine Star during her career.

Aglay joined Reuters as a business reporter in 1995. She had previously also worked as a business reporter for the Philippine Star. Aglay specialized in reporting on commodity stories, such as food pricing, while reporting for Reuters.

Dolly Aglay died of cancer, which she had been battling for almost 3 years, in Manila on May 26, 2008, at the age of 41. According to her husband, Philippine Star reporter Mel Elona, she had been disappointed that she could not report as actively on her stories while being treated for her illness. She "kept talking about missing out on one of the biggest commodities stories of recent years in the Philippines, the rise in rice prices over the past few months."

Aglay was buried at Heritage Memorial Park in Manila on Sunday, June 1, 2008. She was survived by her husband, journalist Melchor “Mel” Elona, and their two children, Julian and Fides. She was also survived by her parents, Pastor Sr. and Maximiana, and her siblings, Josephine, Jane and Pastor Jr.

In 2009, Mel married his former fiancée and long-time friend, editor and short story author, May Alcalde, and now lives with her, their daughter Margarita, and Julian and Fides.

References 

1960s births
2008 deaths
Filipino journalists
Business and financial journalists
Deaths from cancer in the Philippines
Burials at The Heritage Park
20th-century journalists